Tirana TV is a defunct music television station based in Albania. It mainly broadcast Albanian music as well as satirical episodes from well known Albanian satirists.

References

See also
Television in Albania
Vizion Plus
Tring
Communication in Albania
Tip TV
Tring Sport
TV Klan

Defunct television networks in Albania